This article is about the history of the United States Food and Drug Administration.

FDA history

Origins of federal food and drug regulation
Up until the 20th century, there were few federal laws regulating the contents and sale of domestically produced food and pharmaceuticals, with one exception being the short-lived Vaccine Act of 1813. A patchwork of state laws provided varying degrees of protection against unethical sales practices, such as misrepresenting the ingredients of food products or therapeutic substances. The history of the FDA can be traced to the latter part of the 19th century and the U.S. Department of Agriculture's Division of Chemistry (later Bureau of Chemistry). Under Harvey Washington Wiley, appointed chief chemist in 1883, the Division began conducting research into the adulteration and misbranding of food and drugs on the American market. 

Although they had no regulatory powers, the Division published its findings from 1887 to 1902 in a ten-part series entitled Foods and Food Adulterants. Wiley used these findings, and alliances with diverse organizations such as state regulators, the General Federation of Women's Clubs, and national associations of physicians and pharmacists, to lobby for a new federal law to set uniform standards for food and drugs to enter into interstate commerce. Wiley's advocacy came at a time when the public had become aroused to hazards in the marketplace by muckraking journalists like Upton Sinclair, and became part of a general trend for increased federal regulations in matters pertinent to public safety during the Progressive Era. 

The 1902 Biologics Control Act was put in place after diphtheria antitoxin was collected from a horse named Jim who contracted tetanus, resulting in several deaths.
Much credit is given to the deaths of many people in the 1930s, including Eben Byers in 1932 from the ingestion of radithor and many women, some known as The Radium Girls, to making the FDA into the much more powerful organization we know today.

The 1906 Pure Food and Drug Act and creation of the FDA
In June 1906, President Theodore Roosevelt signed into law the Food and Drug Act, also known as the "Wiley Act" after its chief advocate. The Act prohibited, under penalty of seizure of goods, the interstate transport of food which had been "adulterated," with that term referring to the addition of fillers of reduced "quality or strength," coloring to conceal "damage or inferiority," formulation with additives "injurious to health," or the use of "filthy, decomposed, or putrid" substances. 

The act applied similar penalties to the interstate marketing of "adulterated" drugs, in which the "standard of strength, quality, or purity" of the active ingredient was not either stated clearly on the label or listed in the United States Pharmacopeia or the National Formulary. The act also banned "misbranding" of food and drugs. The responsibility for examining food and drugs for such "adulteration" or "misbranding" was given to Wiley's USDA Bureau of Chemistry.

Wiley used these new regulatory powers to pursue an aggressive campaign against the manufacturers of foods with chemical additives, but the Chemistry Bureau's authority was soon checked by judicial decisions, as well as by the creation of the Board of Food and Drug Inspection and the Referee Board of Consulting Scientific Experts as separate organizations within the USDA in 1907 and 1908 respectively. A 1911 Supreme Court decision ruled that the 1906 act did not apply to false claims of therapeutic efficacy, in response to which a 1912 amendment added "false and fraudulent" claims of "curative or therapeutic effect" to the Act's definition of "misbranded." 

However, these powers continued to be narrowly defined by the courts, which set high standards for proof of fraudulent intent. In 1927, the Bureau of Chemistry's regulatory powers were reorganized under a new USDA body, the Food, Drug, and Insecticide organization. This name was shortened to the Food and Drug Administration (FDA) three years later.

The 1938 Food, Drug, and Cosmetic Act
By the 1930s, muckraking journalists, consumer protection organizations, and federal regulators began mounting a campaign for stronger regulatory authority by publicizing a list of injurious products which had been ruled permissible under the 1906 law, including radioactive beverages, the mascara Lash lure, which caused blindness, and worthless "cures" for diabetes and tuberculosis. The resulting proposed law was unable to get through the Congress of the United States for five years, but was rapidly enacted into law following the public outcry over the 1937 Elixir Sulfanilamide tragedy, in which over 100 people died after using a drug formulated with a toxic, untested solvent.

The only way that the FDA could even seize the product was due to a misbranding problem: an "Elixir" was defined as a medication dissolved in ethanol, not the diethylene glycol used in the Elixir Sulfanilamide. Had it been labeled a "solution" instead, it is argued, the agency could have done nothing to track down and confiscate what medication remained in the public's hands.

President Franklin Delano Roosevelt signed the new Food, Drug, and Cosmetic Act (FD&C Act) into law on June 24, 1938. The new law significantly increased federal regulatory authority over drugs by mandating a pre-market review of the safety of all new drugs, as well as banning false therapeutic claims in drug labeling without requiring that the FDA prove fraudulent intent. The law also authorized factory inspections and expanded enforcement powers, set new regulatory standards for foods, and brought cosmetics and therapeutic devices under federal regulatory authority. This law, though extensively amended in subsequent years, remains the central foundation of FDA regulatory authority to the present day.

Regulation of human drugs and medical devices after 1938

Early FD&C Act amendments: 1938–1958
After passage of the 1938 Act, the FDA began to designate certain drugs as safe for use only under the supervision of a medical professional, and the category of "prescription-only" drugs was securely codified into law by the 1951 Durham-Humphrey Amendment. While pre-market testing of drug efficacy was not authorized under the 1938 FD&C Act, subsequent amendments such as the Insulin Amendment and Penicillin Amendment did mandate potency testing for formulations of specific lifesaving pharmaceuticals. The FDA began enforcing its new powers against drug manufacturers who could not substantiate the efficacy claims made for their drugs, and the United States Court of Appeals for the Ninth Circuit ruling in Alberty Food Products Co. v. United States (1950) found that drug manufacturers could not evade the "false therapeutic claims" provision of the 1938 act by simply omitting the intended use of a drug from the drug's label. These developments confirmed extensive powers for the FDA to enforce post-marketing recalls of ineffective drugs. Much of the FDA's regulatory attentions in this era were directed towards abuse of amphetamines and barbiturates, but the agency also reviewed some 13,000 new drug applications between 1938 and 1962. While the science of toxicology was in its infancy at the start of this era, rapid advances in experimental assays for food additive and drug safety testing were made during this period by FDA regulators and others.

The FDA was moved from the Department of Agriculture into the Federal Security Agency in 1940, and remained part of its successor, the Department of Health, Education and Welfare, when it was formed in 1953.

Expansion of premarket approval process: 1959–1985
In 1959, Senator Estes Kefauver began holding congressional hearings into concerns about pharmaceutical industry practices, such as the perceived high cost and uncertain efficacy of many drugs promoted by manufacturers. There was significant opposition, however, to calls for a new law expanding the FDA's authority. This climate was rapidly changed by the thalidomide tragedy, in which thousands of European babies were born deformed after their mothers took that drug - marketed for treatment of nausea - during their pregnancies. Thalidomide had not been approved for use in the U.S. due to the concerns of an FDA reviewer, Frances Oldham Kelsey, about thyroid toxicity. However, thousands of "trial samples" had been sent to American doctors during the "clinical investigation" phase of the drug's development, which at the time was entirely unregulated by the FDA. Individual members of Congress cited the thalidomide incident in lending their support to expansion of FDA authority.

The 1962 Kefauver-Harris Amendment to the FD&C act represented a "revolution" in FDA regulatory authority. The most important change was the requirement that all new drug applications demonstrate "substantial evidence" of the drug's efficacy for a marketed indication, in addition to the existing requirement for pre-marketing demonstration of safety. This marked the start of the FDA approval process in its modern form. Drugs approved between 1938 and 1962 were also subject to FDA review of their efficacy, and to potential withdrawal from the market. Other important provisions of the 1962 amendments included the requirement that drug companies use the "established" or "generic" name of a drug along with the trade name, the restriction of drug advertising to FDA-approved indications, and expansion of FDA powers to inspect drug manufacturing facilities.

These reforms had the effect of increasing the time required to bring a drug to market. In the mid-1970s, 13 of the 14 drugs the FDA saw as most important to approve were on the market in other countries before the United States.

As part of the U.S. Public Health Service reorganizations of 1966–1973, FDA became part of the Public Health Service (PHS) within the Department of Health, Education, and Welfare in 1968.  It was briefly placed under the short-lived PHS Consumer Protection and Environmental Health Service (CPEHS), but reemerged as an operating agency within PHS in 1970.

One of the most important statutes in establishing the modern American pharmaceutical market was the 1984 Drug Price Competition and Patent Term Restoration Act, more commonly known as the "Hatch-Waxman Act" after its chief sponsors. This act was intended to correct two unfortunate interactions between the new regulations mandated by the 1962 amendments, and existing patent law (which is not regulated or enforced by the FDA, but rather by the United States Patent and Trademark Office). Because the additional clinical trials mandated by the 1962 amendments significantly delayed the marketing of new drugs, without extending the duration of the manufacturer's patent, "pioneer" drug manufacturers experienced a decreased period of lucrative market exclusivity. On the other hand, the new regulations could be interpreted to require complete safety and efficacy testing for generic copies of approved drugs, and "pioneer" manufacturers obtained court decisions which prevented generic manufacturers from even beginning the clinical trial process while a drug was still under patent. The Hatch-Waxman Act was intended as a compromise between the "pioneer" and generic drug manufacturers which would reduce the overall cost of bringing generics to market and thus, it was hoped, reduce the long-term price of the drug, while preserving the overall profitability of developing new drugs.

The act extended the patent exclusivity terms of new drugs, and importantly tied those extensions, in part, to the length of the FDA approval process for each individual drug. For generic manufacturers, the Act created a new approval mechanism, the Abbreviated New Drug Application (ANDA), in which the generic drug manufacturer need only demonstrate that their generic formulation has the same active ingredient, route of administration, dosage form, strength, and pharmacokinetic properties ("bioequivalence") as the corresponding brand-name drug. This act has been credited with essentially creating the modern generic drug industry.

FDA reforms in the AIDS era
Concerns about the length of the drug approval process were brought to the fore early in the AIDS epidemic. In the mid- and late 1980s, ACT-UP and other HIV activist organizations accused the FDA of unnecessarily delaying the approval of medications to fight HIV and opportunistic infections, and staged large protests, such as a confrontational October 11, 1988 action at the FDA campus which resulted in nearly 180 arrests. In August 1990, Dr. Louis Lasagna, then chairman of a presidential advisory panel on drug approval, estimated that thousands of lives were lost each year due to delays in approval and marketing of drugs for cancer and AIDS.

Partly in response to these criticisms, the FDA issued new rules to expedite approval of drugs for life-threatening diseases, and expanded pre-approval access to drugs for patients with limited treatment options. The first of these new rules was the "IND exemption" or "treatment IND" rule, which allowed expanded access to a drug undergoing phase II or III trials (or in extraordinary cases even earlier) if it potentially represented a safer or better alternative to treatments currently available for terminal or serious illness. A second new rule, the "parallel track policy", allowed a drug company to set up a mechanism for access to a new potentially lifesaving drug by patients who for various reasons would be unable to participate in ongoing clinical trials. The "parallel track" designation could be made at the time of IND submission. The accelerated approval rules were further expanded and codified in 1992.

All of the initial drugs approved for the treatment of HIV/AIDS were approved through accelerated approval mechanisms. For example, a "treatment IND" was issued for the first HIV drug, AZT, in 1985, and approval was granted just two years later in 1987. Three of the first five drugs targeting HIV were approved in the United States before they were approved in any other country.

Challenges to FDA authority by states
In two instances, state governments have sought to legalize drugs which have not been approved by the FDA. Because federal law passed pursuant to Constitutional authority overrules conflicting state laws, federal authorities still claim the authority to seize, arrest, and prosecute for possession and sales of these substances, even in states where they are legal under state law.

The first wave was the legalization by 27 states of laetrile in the late 1970s. This drug was used as a treatment for cancer, but scientific studies both before and after this legislative trend found it to be ineffective.  Federal law enforcement prevented interstate shipment, making the drug infeasible to manufacture and sell.  Further studies based on a Mexican formulation also showed no effectiveness in treating cancer, but did find that some patients experienced symptoms of cyanide poisoning. Though the political movement died out in the 1980s, FDA enforcement actions against laetrile purveyors continued into the 2000s.

The second wave concerned medical marijuana in the 1990s and 2000s. Though Virginia passed a law with limited effect in 1979, a more widespread trend began in California in 1996. In 2009, the Obama Administration de-prioritized enforcement of federal law against patients using the drug in compliance with state law, but reversed this policy in 2011. Recreational marijuana remains illegal (but not necessarily criminal) in all states and at the federal level, as of 2009.

Regulation of living organisms
With acceptance of premarket notification 510(k) k033391 in January 2004, the FDA granted Dr. Ronald Sherman permission to produce and market medical maggots for use in humans or other animals as a prescription medical device.
Medical maggots represent the first living organism allowed by the Food and Drug Administration for production and marketing as a prescription medical device.

In June 2004, the FDA cleared Hirudo medicinalis (medicinal leeches) as the second living organism to be used as a medical devices.

In 2023 the FDA Modernization Act 2.0 eliminated the requirement that drugs in development must undergo testing in animals before being given to participants in human trials.

Timeline of food and drug legislation
Most federal laws concerning the FDA are part of the Food, Drug and Cosmetic Act, (first passed in 1938 and extensively amended since) and are codified in Title 21, Chapter 9 of the United States Code. Other significant laws enforced by the FDA include the Public Health Service Act, parts of the Controlled Substances Act, the Federal Anti-Tampering Act, as well as many others. In many cases these responsibilities are shared with other federal agencies.

Important enabling legislation for the FDA includes:
 1902Biologics Control Act
 1906Pure Food and Drug Act
 1938Federal Food, Drug, and Cosmetic Act
 1944Public Health Service Act
 19511951 Food, Drug, and Cosmetics Act Amendments PL 82–215
 19621962 Food, Drug, and Cosmetics Act Amendments PL 87–781
 1966Fair Packaging and Labeling Act PL 89–755
 1976Medical Device Regulation Act PL 94–295
 1987Prescription Drug Marketing Act
 1988Anti-Drug Abuse Act of 1988 PL 100–690
 1990Nutrition Labeling and Education Act PL 101–535
 1992Prescription Drug User Fee Act PL 102–571
 1994Dietary Supplement Health and Education Act
 1997Food and Drug Administration Modernization Act 105-115
 2002Bioterrorism Act 107-188
 2002Medical Device User Fee and Modernization Act (MDUFMA) PL 107-250
 2003Animal Drug User Fee Act PL 108-130
 2007Food and Drug Administration Amendments Act of 2007
 2009Family Smoking Prevention and Tobacco Control Act
 2011FDA Food Safety Modernization Act
 2012Food and Drug Administration Safety and Innovation Act

The FDA and the opioid epidemic (2000s)
Faced with the opioid epidemic, which had become a public health crisis by 2017, the FDA requested Endo Pharmaceuticals to remove oxymorphone hydrochloride from the market. It was the first time in FDA history, that the FDA had "taken steps to remove a currently marketed opioid pain medication from sale due to the public health consequences of abuse".

References

Further reading
  

Food and Drug Administration
Food and Drug Administration
Food and Drug Administration